Fencing at the 2005 Islamic Solidarity Games was held in King Fahad Sports City, Ta'if from April 11 to April 16, 2005.

Medal summary

Medal table

References
  kooora.com

2005 Islamic Solidarity Games
2005 in fencing
2005
Fencing competitions in Saudi Arabia